47th Battalion may refer to:

 47th Battalion (Australia), a unit of the Australian Army
 47th Frontenac Battalion, a Canadian Militia unit
 47th (British Columbia) Battalion, CEF, a unit of the Canadian Army
 47th Virginia Cavalry Battalion, a unit of the Confederate States Army

See also
 47th Division (disambiguation)
 47th Regiment (disambiguation)
 47 Squadron (disambiguation)